The Welterweight competition was the fifth-heaviest class featured at the 2011 World Amateur Boxing Championships, held at the Heydar Aliyev Sports and Exhibition Complex.

Medalists

Seeds

  Imre Bacskai (third round)
  Myke Ribeiro (first round)
  Andrey Zamkovoy (quarterfinals)
  Freddie Evans (quarterfinals)
  Maitituersun Qiong (first round)
  Alexis Vastine (third round)
  Mahamed Nurudzinau (second round)
  Emil Ahmedov (first round)
  Serik Sapiyev (runner-up)
  Ilyas Abbadi (first round)

Draw

Finals

Top half

Section 1

Section 2

Bottom half

Section 3

Section 4

External links
Draw

Welterweight